Diuris abbreviata, commonly known as the lemon doubletail, is a species of orchid that is endemic to eastern Australia. It has two or three leaves and a flowering stem with up to nine yellow flowers with darker markings.

Description
Flowering occurs from September to November.

Taxonomy and naming
Diuris abbreviata was first formally described in 1873 by George Bentham from a previously unpublished description by Ferdinand von Mueller and Bentham's description was published in Flora Australiensis. The specific epithet (abbreviata) is a Latin word meaning "shortened".

Distribution and habitat
The lemon doubletail grows in forest and grassland on the ranges and tablelands of New South Wales north of Barrington Tops to south-east Queensland.

References

abbreviata
Endemic orchids of Australia
Orchids of New South Wales
Plants described in 1873